Negres Tempestes is an anarchist organisation based in the Catalan Countries. The group defends the principle of independence and self-determination, but opposes the creation of new statist institutions, being highly critical of the notion that independence necessitates the "attainment of a state, with the authoritarianism it implies".

The collective presented themselves to the public on June 17, 2005, after four years of encounters between various individuals in the Black Bloc of the annual 11th of September demonstrations. It gathers and focuses much of its activity on the  Can Vies Self-Managed Social Center, in the Sants district.

The organisation describes itself as opposed to "the state as a basis of authority, repression and economic exploitation" as well as "dogma, states or borders", while participating in struggles in defence of the Catalan language and culture.

See also
 Postcolonial anarchism
 Anarchism and nationalism
 Democratic confederalism
 Anarchist-Communist Federation of Occitania

References 

Anarchist organisations in Spain
Autonomy
Catalan independence movement
Far-left politics in Spain
Stateless nationalism in Europe